Marin Draganja and Dino Marcan were the defending champions, but they did not compete in the Juniors this year.

Duilio Beretta and Roberto Quiroz won in the final 6–3, 6–2, against Facundo Argüello and Agustín Velotti.

Seeds

Draw

Finals

Top half

Bottom half
{{16TeamBracket-Compact-Tennis3
| RD1=First round
| RD2=Second round
| RD3=Quarterfinals
| RD4=Semifinals

| RD1-seed01=7
| RD1-team01= Duilio Beretta Roberto Quiroz
| RD1-score01-1=6
| RD1-score01-2=6
| RD1-score01-3= 
| RD1-seed02= 
| RD1-team02= Miki Janković Mate Pavić
| RD1-score02-1=2
| RD1-score02-2=4
| RD1-score02-3= 

| RD1-seed03= 
| RD1-team03= Grégoire Barrère Lucas Pouille
| RD1-score03-1=62
| RD1-score03-2=2
| RD1-score03-3= 
| RD1-seed04= 
| RD1-team04= Justin Eleveld Jannick Lupescu
| RD1-score04-1=77
| RD1-score04-2=6
| RD1-score04-3= 

| RD1-seed05= 
| RD1-team05= Tristan Lamasine Mick Lescure
| RD1-score05-1=2
| RD1-score05-2=7
| RD1-score05-3=[10]
| RD1-seed06= 
| RD1-team06={{nowrap| Juan Sebastián Gómez Darian King}}
| RD1-score06-1=6| RD1-score06-2=5
| RD1-score06-3=[12]| RD1-seed07= 
| RD1-team07= Daniel Berta Tobias Blomgren
| RD1-score07-1=0
| RD1-score07-2=4
| RD1-score07-3= 
| RD1-seed08=4
| RD1-team08= James Duckworth Jason Kubler| RD1-score08-1=6| RD1-score08-2=6| RD1-score08-3= 

| RD1-seed09=6
| RD1-team09= Mitchell Frank Junior A. Ore
| RD1-score09-1=3
| RD1-score09-2=3
| RD1-score09-3= 
| RD1-seed10= 
| RD1-team10= Carlos Boluda-Purkiss Alessandro Colella| RD1-score10-1=6| RD1-score10-2=6| RD1-score10-3= 

| RD1-seed11= 
| RD1-team11= Filip Horanský Jozef Kovalík
| RD1-score11-1=4
| RD1-score11-2=6'''
| RD1-score11-3=[4]
| RD1-seed12= 
| RD1-team12=

References
 Main Draw

Boys Doubles
2010